Henri-Edmond Limet called Edmond Bailly (19 June 1850 – 8 September 1916) was a French librarian and publisher.

Biography 
Edmond Bailly was a musician and writer of symbolic, theosophical and esoteric inspiration. He wrote essays, narratives and articles on "esoteric music".
  
His most remarkable work was undoubtedly his direction of the Librairie de l'art independant opened in Paris at 11 Rue de la Chaussée-d'Antin. There, he published several magazines and took care of young authors. Thus he became one of the animators of symbolism but also of the Theosophical Society. André Gide, Paul Claudel, Henri de Régnier, Pierre Louÿs, Louis-Nicolas Ménard began publishing their first works at the Librairie de l'Art Indépendant, which closed in 1917.

Works 
 1888: Étude sur la vie et les œuvres de Friedrich Gottlieb Klopstock.<ref>[https://archive.org/details/tudesurlavieetl00bailgoog Étude sur la vie et les œuvres de Friedrich Gottlieb Klopstock]</ref>
 1887: Lumen, féerie chatoyante.
 1900: Le son dans la nature, in "The Theosophical Review", No.26, August, page 573.   
 1900: Le Pittoresque musical à l'Exposition.
 1903: L'Islamisme et son enseignement ésotérique.
 1909: La Légende de Diamant, sept récits du monde celtique.
 1912: Le Chant des voyelles comme invocation aux dieux planétaires.

 Bibliography 
 Frédéric Maget, Edmond Bailly et la Librairie de l’Art indépendant (1889–1917), mémoire de master, Centre d'histoire culturelle des sociétés contemporaines, Université de Versailles Saint-Quentin-en-Yvelines, 2006.
 Denis Herlin, "Le cercle de l’Art indépendant", in Debussy, La musique et les arts, catalogue of the exhibition Debussy at the musée de l’Orangerie (22 February - 11 June 2012), Musée d’Orsay/Skira/Flammarion, 2012,,.
 Denis Herlin,  « À la Librairie de l’Art indépendant : musique, poésie, art et ésotérisme », Histoires littéraires'', vol. XVII (no 68 ; October–December 2016),.

References

External links 
 
 Edmond Bailly. Librairie de l'art indépendant

19th-century French writers
20th-century French writers
French publishers (people)
French Theosophists
French librarians
People from Lille
1850 births
1916 deaths